Park Yang-Gae is a South Korean former basketball player who competed in the 1984 Summer Olympics. Her skill in the position of point guard, particularly in passing, earned her the nickname of "computer guard" during her career.

References

Year of birth missing (living people)
Living people
South Korean women's basketball players
Basketball players at the 1984 Summer Olympics
Medalists at the 1984 Summer Olympics
Olympic basketball players of South Korea
Olympic silver medalists for South Korea
Olympic medalists in basketball
Basketball players at the 1982 Asian Games
Asian Games medalists in basketball
Asian Games silver medalists for South Korea
Medalists at the 1982 Asian Games
Point guards